USS Waterford (ARD-5) was an Auxiliary floating drydock that served in the United States Navy during World War II, the Korean War, the Vietnam War, and the Persian Gulf War. She later served the Chilean Navy as Talcahuano (133).

Ship History 
Waterford (ARD-5) was originally the unnamed, steel-hulled, auxiliary repair drydock ARD-5. She was completed in June 1942 at Alameda, California, by the Pacific Bridge Company. During the war, she served Pearl Harbor and San Francisco. At the end of World War II she was serving at the navy yard at Mare Island, California. She remained there until shifting to the east coast to serve the repair needs of the Atlantic Fleet. ARD-5 was named Waterford on 17 November 1976. She remained active, "in service" with the Atlantic Fleet into 1979—serving Groton and Naval Submarine Base New London.

Fate 
In February 1997, the nuclear research submarine NR-1 docked, and undocked by late March. Waterford was decommissioned on 9 September 1997, and struck from the Naval Register on 1 October 1997. On 10 March 1999, she was disposed of via the Security Assistance Program to the Republic of Chile. She was renamed Talcahuano (133) on 30 August 1999.

Ship Awards

External links 
- NavSource, ARD-5 WATERFORD
- The USS Waterford
  Page 40-43, All Hands Magazine, March 1984
- U.S. Naval Register, ARD-5
- Navy Crew List ARD-5

References 

1942 ships
ARD-2-class floating drydocks
Floating drydocks of the United States Navy